Perryfields Academy (formerly Perryfields High School) is a coeducational secondary school located on the Brandhall housing estate in Oldbury, West Midlands, England.

History
It has served the local community since 1956, first as a secondary modern school and then as a community comprehensive school with Mathematics and Computing College status.

In May 2021 Perryfields High School converted to academy status and was renamed Perryfields Academy. The school is now sponsored by Broadleaf Partnership Trust.

School structure
The school has five house groups which pupils are split into: Pioneer, Mariner, Enterprise, Voyager and Challenger.

Ranking
In 2009, it was the highest ranking secondary school in Sandwell, with 74% of pupils gaining 5 or more GCSEs at grade C or above.

Awards and honors
The school won the Diana Princess of Wales Anti-Bullying Award in 2006 for its policy on tackling bullying.

References

External links

Oldbury, West Midlands
Secondary schools in Sandwell
Academies in Sandwell
Educational institutions established in 1956
1956 establishments in England